Carolyn De Fonseca (25 May 1929 – May 2009) was an American actress based in Rome. She worked extensively as a voice actress for the English-language dubbing of several hundred foreign (mostly Italian) films from the early 1960s and onwards. She was also the wife of actor/voice dubber Ted Rusoff, with whom she frequently worked. She died in 2009.

Career
De Fonseca first came to Rome in the early 1960s and tried to make a career for herself as an actress. She played a small role in the acclaimed A Difficult Life (1961), directed by Dino Risi, and had a supporting role as Chloe, the love potion maker, in the sword and sandal film Damon and Pythias (1962). She also had bit part roles in some big productions that did shooting in Italy, such as Barabbas (1961) and The Pink Panther (1963). She never really found much success as an actress but she quickly became a prolific and successful voice dubbing artist.

Some of her earliest dubbing work were in the peplum films Mole Men Against the Son of Hercules (1961) and Ursus in the Valley of the Lions (1961), in which she provided the voice of actress Moira Orfei in the English dubbed versions of the film. Subsequently, De Fonseca dubbed a series of further peplum film and she was also given the chance to dub the voice of American actress Jayne Mansfield in two of her European films which were post-synchronized without Mansfield's involvement: Primitive Love (1964) and Dog Eat Dog (1964). She also provided Mansfield's voice in the infamous quasi-documentary The Wild, Wild World of Jayne Mansfield (1968). Released after Mansfield's death, this mondo-style cult documentary consists of footage of Mansfield visiting various night clubs and beaches while narrating her experiences. Since Mansfield died before the film's completion, De Fonseca performs the task of voicing Mansfield's thoughts and narration.

In the 1960s, De Fonseca dubbed many leading ladies into English, but eventually became more prolific in dubbing villainesses in various sword and sandal and horror films. After a supporting role in the caper film Midas Run (1969) with Fred Astaire and Richard Crenna, she would give up her acting career and focus solely on dubbing films into English. She specialized in voicing femme fatale characters such as the evil queen (played by Jany Clair) in Hercules vs. the Moon Men (1964), a bitchy tourist (played by Silvia Solar) in Eyeball (1975) and the deranged inmate Albina in Women's Prison Massacre (1983). She would also typically dub exotic figures or upper-class nymphomaniacs, such as a sex-hungry asylum patient (played by Rosalba Neri) in Slaughter Hotel (1971), and a sassy, black nightclub performer (played by Carla Brait) in The Case of the Bloody Iris (1972). De Fonseca would also sometimes deliver very over the top performances; dubbing the voices of sobbing and hysterical figures such as a paranoid asylum patient (played by Rossella Falk) in Seven Blood-Stained Orchids (1972), a sexually frustrated housewife (played by Carroll Baker) in My Father's Wife (1976), and a drug-addicted nun (played by Anita Ekberg) in The Killer Nun (1978).

As the Italian film industry was slowing down somewhat in the 1980s, De Fonseca resumed her career as a film actress in various American films that were shot in Rome, while still continuing to work with dubbing. On screen she played Christopher Reeve's secretary in Monsignor (1982), had a supporting role in the Pia Zadora film The Lonely Lady (1983), played a comedic role as an American tourist in Detective School Dropouts (1986) and finally appeared in Bernardo Bertolucci's The Sheltering Sky (1990). On television, she appeared in the highly acclaimed miniseries The Winds of War (1983). She also appeared alongside her real-life husband Ted Rusoff in the miniseries Mussolini and I (1985), in which they play the parents of Mussolini's mistress, Claretta Petacci, and played a supporting part in the TV movie thriller The Fifth Missile (1986).

List of dubbing roles (incomplete)

References

External links
 

1929 births
2009 deaths
American voice actresses
20th-century American actresses
20th-century American people
21st-century American women